Serious About Comedy was a British comedy discussion show on the digital radio station BBC7, hosted by Robin Ince. It was broadcast at 08:30 and 22:00 on Fridays, and 03:00 on Saturdays, in series of 12 editions long. It started on 12 August 2005. The second series started on 10 February 2006. The third series started on 18 August 2006 and ended on 2 November. Two editions in the third series were presented by Kevin Day. No reason was given for Ince's absence. Series four started on 16 February 2007 and series five on 24 August 2007, with the last ever edition being broadcast on 9 November 2007.

On each show, guests from the comedy world, such as comedians, comedy writers and critics talked about what was going on in comedy that week. They reviewed shows on television, radio and new DVD and Audio releases.

Listeners could also contact the show to voice their opinions via the programme's website. Each week, some emails and posts on the BBC7 messageboard were read out by Ince. Also, members of the public could send in their own comedy recommendations. Several times, no-one sent in any recommendations, so they asked one of the Serious About Comedy staff to give theirs instead; this feature was dropped in the fifth (and final) series.

External links 
BBC7 Serious About Comedy Website.
Serious About Comedy parody

Serious About Comedy
BBC Radio 7 (rebranded) programmes